The Association of Secondary Ticket Agents, or ASTA UK, is the self-appointed Regulatory Body of the Secondary Ticket Industry in the United Kingdom. The Association was established in October 2005, and represents some companies engaged in the selling of tickets to entertainment and sporting events.

The ASTA UK is affiliated with the National Association of Ticket Brokers in the United States. ASTA is recognised by some Government bodies as the representative body for Secondary Ticket Agents. Another body, the Society of Ticket Agents and Retailers, also represents Primary ticket sellers and resellers.

Code of ethics
The Association requires its members to maintain a high level of ethics in the marketplace and therefore has adopted a set of standards and procedures that govern the conduct of its members.

Bonding scheme
All members of the Association Of Secondary Ticket Agents (ASTA UK) proposed a scheme underwritten by a Lloyd's of London Broker and scrutinised by the Financial Services Authority. The scheme was well received generally but failed ultimately due to a lack of cross party support.

References

External links
 ASTA Official website

Regulators of the United Kingdom
Tickets
Entertainment in the United Kingdom
2005 establishments in the United Kingdom
Organizations established in 2005